Joseph Douglas Noble Jr. (born 1967) is a United States Navy rear admiral who has served as the Director of Logistics Operations of the Defense Logistics Agency and Commander of Joint Regional Combat Support since May 19, 2021. Previously, he served as the Commander of the Naval Supply Systems Command Weapon Systems Support.

Raised in Crystal Lake, Illinois, Noble graduated from the United States Naval Academy in 1989 with a B.S. degree in electrical engineering. He was commissioned as a Supply Corps officer. Noble later earned an M.S. degree in operations research from the Naval Postgraduate School in December 2000. He has also received an M.B.A. degree from the Kelley School of Business at Indiana University.

References

External links
 

1967 births
Living people
Place of birth missing (living people)
People from Crystal Lake, Illinois
United States Naval Academy alumni
Naval Postgraduate School alumni
Kelley School of Business alumni
Recipients of the Legion of Merit
United States Navy admirals
Recipients of the Defense Superior Service Medal
Military personnel from Illinois